Paddock Valley Dam is a dam in Washington County, Idaho.

This earthen dam was constructed in 1949 by the local Little Willow Irrigation District, with a height of 43 feet and a length of 300 feet long at its crest.  It impounds Little Willow Creek for flood control and irrigation water storage, owned and operated by the local district.

The reservoir it creates, Paddock Valley Reservoir, has a normal surface area of 1,300 acres and maximum capacity of 36,400 acre-feet.  Recreation includes fishing for Yellow Bullhead, Crappie, Largemouth Bass, Smallmouth Bass, Bluegill, and Punkinseed Sunfish.  In 2008 the site was the tentative location of a nuclear power plant planned by MidAmerican Nuclear Energy, which was deemed not cost-effective.

References 

Dams in Idaho
Reservoirs in Idaho
United States local public utility dams
Dams completed in 1949
Buildings and structures in Washington County, Idaho
Lakes of Washington County, Idaho
1949 establishments in Idaho